Ameyal (from the Nahuatl word āmēyalli, meaning natural well or spring) is a brand of Mexican soft drink. It is also a brand of fruit sodas available only in Toluca, Cuernavaca, and Mexico D.F. Ameyal was formerly owned by Coordinación Industrial Mexicana (CIMSA), a Coca-Cola bottling company stationed in Toluca, Cuernavaca, and Mexico D.F. In 2008, Ameyal was acquired by The Coca-Cola Company. There was also a Club Soda version of Ameyal, but was acquired by Coca-Cola and renamed to Ciel Mineralizada.

Flavors
 Strawberry-Kiwifruit
 Pineapple
 Lemonade
 Sangria
 Tutti-fruti
 Mandarin

References

Coca-Cola brands
Mexican drinks